Elijah M. K. Glenn (August 12, 1807after 1870) was a member of the New York State Assembly. 

He was born in Amsterdam, New York to Scottish parents, on August 12, 1807. He studied to become a shoemaker. Glenn was, for fifteen years, an abolitionist who travelled around the country giving lectures. In the late 1840s, he was lecturer for the New York Antislavery Society. When he was twenty-one, Glenn married, and would have six children. During the last forty rears of his life, he lived in Montgomery County, New York, and for twenty years in Macedon, New York. Glenn served as a keeper at Sing Sing Prison, and was in 1861 to 1866, the postmaster of Macedon. 

He helped organize the Liberty Party, which he supported until switching to the Republican Party in 1850. Glenn was elected a member of the New York State Assembly from the first district of Cayuga County. 

In 1868, Glenn accused Alexander Frear of attempting to bribe him on the topic of the Erie Railroad. On April 10, a select committee appointed to investigate concluded that "the evidence does not furnish any justification for the charges made by Mr. Glenn against Mr. Frear." Thereupon a resolution was passed to censure Glenn. On April 11, Glenn resigned his seat. In November, he was re-elected, and took his seat again in January 1869.

References 

1807 births
People from Amsterdam, New York
Members of the New York State Assembly
Year of death missing